Nebraska Highway 63 is a north–south highway in eastern Nebraska with a length of . It is also known throughout Cass County as 238th Street, except in the village of Alvo, where it adopts the name Russell Street. Its southern terminus is at U.S. Highway 34 east of Eagle.  Its northern terminus is at U.S. Highway 6 southwest of Ashland.

Route description
Nebraska Highway 63 begins at US 34 east of Eagle. It goes north into farmland through Alvo before intersecting Interstate 80. It goes north towards Ashland before ending at US 6. Nebraska Highway 63 currently lies entirely in Cass County. Exit signage on Interstate 80 indicates the Nebraska Highway 63 exit as the exit for Ashland and Greenwood.

History
Prior to October 24, 2005, Nebraska Highway 63 extended north from its present terminus on a concurrency with U.S. Highway 6 to Ashland.  At Ashland, it turned north, and followed a highway which went north and west near the villages of Memphis and Ithaca, eventually terminating at U.S. Highway 77 south of Wahoo. On that day, that part of the highway was renumbered as Nebraska Highway 66.

Major intersections

References

External links

Nebraska Roads: NE 61-80

063
Transportation in Cass County, Nebraska